Rakhwala is a 1971 Indian Hindi-language action thriller film directed by Adurthi Subba Rao. The film stars Dharmendra, Leena Chandavarkar and Vinod Khanna. It is a remake of the 1967 Tamil film Kaavalkaaran.

Cast
Dharmendra ...  Deepak Kumar 
Leena Chandavarkar ...  Chandni 
Vinod Khanna ...  Shyam 
Madan Puri ...  Boxing Chairman Jwalaprasad 
Jagdeep ...  Gopi 
Rakesh Pandey ...  Suresh 
Rajan Haksar ...  Jwalaprasad's Manager 
Keshav Rana...  Police Commissioner 
Randhir ...  Dr. Girdharilal 
Shyam Kumar  (as Sham Kumar) 
Raj Kishore ...  Bartender 
Sanjana ...  Girija 
Baby Gayatri ...  Pinky

Soundtrack
The music was composed by Kalyanji Anandji. The author Sujata Dev stated that the song "Rehne Do Gile Shikwe", a Rafi-Asha duet, is an "excellent example of the adeptness in unifying classical and contemporary music in the same song."

Reception
Vijay Lokapally of The Hindu said the film, "had its bright moments in the presence of Dharmendra and Vinod Khanna, two evergreen stars of Indian cinema."

References

External links 
 

1970s action thriller films
1970s Hindi-language films
1971 films
Films directed by Adurthi Subba Rao
Films scored by Kalyanji Anandji
Hindi remakes of Tamil films
Indian action thriller films